The 2020 Sport Clips Haircuts VFW 200 was a NASCAR Xfinity Series race held on September 5, 2020. It was contested over 147 laps on the  egg-shaped oval racetrack. It was the twenty-third race of the 2020 NASCAR Xfinity Series season. Joe Gibbs Racing driver Brandon Jones collected his third win of the season.

Report

Background 
Darlington Raceway is a race track built for NASCAR racing located near Darlington, South Carolina. It is nicknamed "The Lady in Black" and "The Track Too Tough to Tame" by many NASCAR fans and drivers and advertised as "A NASCAR Tradition." It is of a unique, somewhat egg-shaped design, an oval with the ends of very different configurations, a condition which supposedly arose from the proximity of one end of the track to a minnow pond the owner refused to relocate. This situation makes it very challenging for the crews to set up their cars' handling in a way that is effective at both ends.

Entry list 

 (R) denotes rookie driver.
 (i) denotes driver who is ineligible for series driver points.

Qualifying 
Justin Haley was awarded the pole for the race as determined by competition-based formula.

Qualifying results

Race

Race results

Stage Results 
Stage One
Laps: 45

Stage Two
Laps: 45

Final Stage Results 

Laps: 57

Race statistics 

 Lead changes: 17 among 6 different drivers
 Cautions/Laps: 7 for 37
 Time of race: 1 hour, 58 minutes, and 32 seconds
 Average speed:

References 

NASCAR races at Darlington Raceway
2020 in sports in South Carolina
Sport Clips Haircuts VFW 200
2020 NASCAR Xfinity Series